The 2018 BUBBA Burger Sports Car Grand Prix was a sports car race sanctioned by the International Motor Sports Association (IMSA). It was held at Long Beach street circuit in Long Beach, California on 14 April 2018. The race was the third round of the 2018 WeatherTech SportsCar Championship.

The overall race was won by the #5 Action Express Racing team of João Barbosa and Filipe Albuquerque, the duo's second win of the season. In GTLM, Oliver Gavin and Tommy Milner won for Corvette Racing, their second consecutive victory at the event.

Background
The event was run as a support race to the Grand Prix of Long Beach, the annual IndyCar Series race held at the circuit. The Pirelli World Challenge and Stadium Super Trucks also ran during the weekend. The race was also the joint-shortest of the season, at just 100 minutes, identical to the Chevrolet Detroit Grand Prix.

Entries

A total of 22 cars took part in the event; 14 in the Prototype (P) class and 8 in the GT Le Mans (GTLM) class. The GT Daytona (GTD) class did not take part in the event, owing to a lack of garage space at the circuit. Spirit of Daytona Racing withdrew from the event following a late accident in the previous month's 12 Hours of Sebring. BAR1 Motorsports also withdrew after attending Daytona, but skipping Sebring. In GTLM, the lineup remained unchanged, apart from Risi Competizione's exit.

Qualifying Results

Results

References

External links
IMSA Entry List Notebook

2018 BUBBA Burger Sports Car Grand Prix
BUBBA Burger Sports Car Grand Prix
BUBBA Burger Sports Car Grand Prix
BUBBA Burger Sports Car Grand Prix